"Ready, Set, Don't Go" is a song by American singer Billy Ray Cyrus featuring his daughter and fellow American singer Miley Cyrus. It was released as the lead single from the former's tenth studio album Home at Last on August 13, 2007. The song has received different interpretations, although, in actuality, Cyrus wrote the song several years before its release when Miley moved to Los Angeles in order to pursue an acting career with an audition for the Disney Channel Original Series Hannah Montana. "Ready, Set, Don't Go" received critical praise, with reviewers complimenting its lyrical content. It also reached positive commercial responses for Cyrus, compared to his downfall in previous years. Peaking at number 37 on the Billboard Hot 100, it became Cyrus' first entry on the chart since "You Won't Be Lonely Now" (2000). 

The song's accompanying music video was directed by Elliot Lester and features some of Cyrus's home movies; it received a CMT Music Award nomination at the 2008 CMT Music Awards. The song eventually became re-released as a duet with Miley. At the time of the single's release, she was 14 and enjoying the success of her debut album Hannah Montana 2: Meet Miley Cyrus. The duet version became Miley's debut in country music and received better commercial outcomes. It reached its highest international peak in the Billboard Hot 100 at number 37 and became Cyrus' first international chart entry since "Could've Been Me" (1992). Cyrus, with and without his daughter, performed the song at several venues, most notably Miley's first headlining concert tour, the Best of Both Worlds Tour.

Background and reception

"Ready, Set, Don't Go" is a country pop song which merges some of Home at Lasts adult contemporary style. It is set in common time with a ballad tempo of 76 beats per minute. The song is written in a key of D major. Cyrus' and Miley's vocals each span two octaves, from B2 to B4. The verses use a chord progression of D-Bm7-G twice, followed by Em and A, while the chorus uses G-A-D twice followed by G-Bm-Em-A-D.

Written alongside Casey Beathard, Cyrus discussed Home at Last in an interview with Calvin Gilbert of CMT News in which he said the song was about children growing up and moving on, from his own experience of moving his family to Los Angeles to help Miley with her acting and singing career.

Amazon's Tammy La Gorce commented, "Hannah fans will fall for 'Ready, Set, Don't Go,' a dad-to-daughter song that sweetly underscores the love in Cyrus' real-life heart." Jeffrey B. Remz of Country Standard Time wrote that the song "finds Cyrus in good form."

Chart performance

Solo version
"Ready, Set, Don't Go" debuted at number 67 on Billboards Hot Digital Songs Chart which led to an appearance on the Billboard Hot 100 for the week ending August 4, 2007; the solo version debuted and peaked at number 85 on the chart. "Ready, Set, Don't Go" became Cyrus' first appearance on the Hot 100 since "You Won't Be Lonely Now" (2000), which peaked at number 80. It also peaked at number 47 on Hot Country Songs and number 58 on the now-defunct Pop 100 chart.

Duet version
The duet version of "Ready, Set, Don't Go" enjoyed much more commercial success than the original version due to Miley's popularity. It debuted at number 85 in the Billboard Hot 100 for the week ending October 27, 2007. On the week ending January 26, 2008, the song ascended to number 40 on the Hot 100, becoming Cyrus first top 40 hit since his debut single "Achy Breaky Heart" (1992), which peaked at number four. The song ultimately peaked at number 37 on the Hot 100 for the week ending February 16, 2008. It also peaked at number four on Hot Country Songs, Cyrus' first top 10 on the chart since "Busy Man" (1999) peaked at number three, and number 44 on Pop 100. In the Canadian Hot 100, the song debuted at number 94 for the week ending on November 24, 2006. For the week ending February 2, 2008, the song reached its peak on the chart, at number 47. It became Cyrus' first international chart entry since "Could've Been Me" (1992). The song was released to US country radio on October 10, 2007

Music video
 
The music video for "Ready, Set, Don't Go" was directed by Elliot Lester. The video begins with a close-up of Cyrus' hand playing an acoustic guitar. It then transitions into showing him. He is sitting on top of two black trunks in a dark, vacant room, wearing a lavender-colored shirt with a gray tee underneath, jeans, and cowboy boots. As Cyrus continues playing the guitar, images of Miley appear on the background. The images range from Miley's infant to teenage years. As Cyrus sings, nodding his head and flipping his hair intensely, a variety of home movies are played. This continues for the rest of the video. The scene ends with a video of Miley leaving in a yellow taxicab is shown in the background. The final scene has Cyrus with Miley as she takes her first steps and he says, "alright".

The video received a nomination for "Tearjerker Video of the Year", but lost to Kellie Pickler's video for "I Wonder" at the 2008 CMT Music Awards.

Live performances 

Cyrus premiered "Ready, Set, Don't Go" on June 9, 2007 at the CMA Music Festival. Cyrus introduced the song as a duet on October 9 on Dancing with the Stars. Cyrus joined Miley on The Oprah Winfrey Show on December 20 to perform the song. "Ready, Set, Don't Go" was most notably performed on the Best of Both Worlds Tour. On selected dates, Cyrus and another one of his daughters, Brandi, joined Miley to perform the song as an encore. On April 14, 2008, "Ready, Set, Don't Go" was performed as duet at the CMT Music Awards. The performance begun with Cyrus, wearing an open white shirt with a brown tee underneath and jeans, playing an acoustic guitar that was strapped to him. By the line, "wherever they are", Miley, wearing a multicolored cocktail dress, joined him from the back of the stage. 

On January 19, 2009, the song was performed at the Kids' Inaugural: "We Are the Future" event in celebration of Barack Obama's inauguration. Dressed in a graphic tee and jeans, Miley finished performing "Fly on the Wall" and asked Cyrus to join her onstage to perform the song. Cyrus was dressed in a black tee shirt, jeans, and a black leather jacket.

Charts

Solo version

Duet version

Year-end charts

References

External links

 "Ready, Set, Don't Go" music video on CMT

2000s ballads
2007 singles
2007 songs
Billy Ray Cyrus songs
Miley Cyrus songs
Male–female vocal duets
Songs about fathers
Songs written by Billy Ray Cyrus
Songs written by Casey Beathard
Walt Disney Records singles
Country ballads
Pop ballads